Gordon Chilton Smith (born April 9, 1939) is a former American football player and coach. He played professionally as a tight end in the National Football League (NFL) with the Minnesota Vikings for five seasons, from 1961 to 1965. Smith played college football at Arizona State University and the University of Missouri under head coach Dan Devine. 

After retiring from playing, Smith became an assistant football coach at the University of Arkansas in 1966. In December 1967, he was hired as an assistant football coach at Iowa State University under new head coach, Johnny Majors with whom Smith worked as an assistant at Arkansas. Smith served as offensive coordinator at Iowa State before resigning after the 1970 season to take a job with the federal government.

References

External links
 

1939 births
Living people
American football tight ends
Arizona State Sun Devils football players
Arkansas Razorbacks football coaches
Iowa State Cyclones football coaches
Minnesota Vikings players
Missouri Tigers football players
People from Douglas, Arizona
Players of American football from Phoenix, Arizona